Opostega diorthota is a moth of the family Opostegidae. It was described by Edward Meyrick in 1893. It is known from Western Australia.

Adults have been recorded in October.

References

Opostegidae
Moths described in 1893